John William Carver (born 16 January 1965) is an English association football coach and former player. At Newcastle United, he held assistant coaching roles under Bobby Robson and Alan Pardew, and was the interim manager following Pardew's departure. Away from Newcastle, he was also assistant coach to Kevin Blackwell at Leeds United and Luton Town, as well as at Plymouth Argyle under Paul Mariner. As manager, he took charge of Toronto FC from 2008 to 2009 and Omonoia Nicosia from 2016 to 2017.

Playing career
Carver was born in Newcastle upon Tyne, and was raised in Cruddas Park. Carver joined Montagu and North Fenham Boys Club when he was nine, which led to him being signed by his hometown club, Newcastle United, as an apprentice when he was 16. He signed a professional contract with the club in January 1983 but never made his league debut, and was released in 1985.

Carver then spent a season at Cardiff City, making 13 appearances, but a thigh injury ended his professional career at the age of 20. Afterwards, he played semi-professional football for Gateshead from 1987 to 1990, whilst working his way up the coaching ladder in Newcastle, starting out in schools before landing the role of director at Newcastle's School of Excellence in 1992.

Coaching career

Newcastle United
Carver was the assistant manager to Bobby Robson at Newcastle United. Following Robson's sacking in August 2004, Carver was appointed caretaker manager and guided the team to a 3–0 win against Blackburn Rovers. Carver later dedicated the win to Robson. Despite the victory, Carver was not considered for the permanent job, that position going to Graeme Souness who opted to bring in his own backroom staff; Carver left the club in September 2004.

Leeds United
In July 2005, Leeds United appointed Carver as a first team coach, replacing the departed Adrian Boothroyd who left the club to be the new manager of Watford. He was part of the management team of Kevin Blackwell and Sam Ellis. Following the exit of Ellis in May 2006, Carver was promoted to the position of assistant manager.

Carver became a caretaker manager for the second time in his career, after Leeds fired Kevin Blackwell following a poor start to the season. Carver celebrated a win in his first game in charge after beating Birmingham City 3–2. However, a series of heavy defeats under Carver's management, culminating in a 5–1 drubbing by Luton Town, led to Leeds' chairman Ken Bates opting instead to recruit the Swindon management team of Dennis Wise and Gus Poyet. Carver left Leeds on 23 October 2006, with David Geddis briefly taking charge of caretaker duties.

Luton Town
Kevin Blackwell subsequently became the manager of Luton Town, and he recruited Carver as his assistant, along with another ex-Leeds coach Sam Ellis. With Luton going through major financial difficulties, including the administrator's decision to sell players from under the management's feet, Carver, along with Blackwell and Ellis were sacked.

Toronto FC
On 1 February 2008, Carver became head coach of the Major League Soccer (MLS) side Toronto FC, with previous coach, Mo Johnston, remaining as manager and director of soccer. He was thereby reunited with an old friend from Newcastle United, since Paul Winsper had been hired in January as strength and conditioning coach.

In April 2009, Carver was charged $750 by MLS for openly criticising the standard of refereeing during a 3–2 loss away to FC Dallas. He was absent from the bench during a 1–0 home win over Chivas USA four days later and eventually resigned on 25 April 2009, one day before the team's home clash with Kansas City Wizards.

Plymouth Argyle and Sheffield United
In December 2009, Carver was appointed assistant head coach to Paul Mariner at Plymouth Argyle. On 14 January 2010, he rejected an approach from Burnley manager Brian Laws to join the Lancashire club as a coach, stating his desire to repay the loyalty shown by Paul Mariner and the club as his reason for staying.

In August 2010, Carver was appointed first team coach at Sheffield United by manager Gary Speed, who had played under Carver when he was assistant manager at Newcastle United. This appointment reunited Carver with Sam Ellis, who was assistant to Speed. Following Speed's departure from Sheffield United to become coach of the Wales national team on 14 December, Carver was appointed as caretaker manager. He left the club on 30 December 2010, when Micky Adams was appointed as manager.

Return to Newcastle United
On 18 January 2011, Newcastle United announced that Carver would be their new assistant manager until the end of the season. Manager Alan Pardew said it was only a short-term deal to see how the two worked together and if he worked well with the set-up. On 25 February, he signed a new five-and-a-half-year contract with Newcastle.

On 17 March 2013, Carver was sent to the stands by the match officials at half-time during Newcastle's match at Wigan Athletic. This was due to his reaction towards Wigan player Callum McManaman following a high tackle on Newcastle's defender Massadio Haïdara, which saw Haïdara stretchered off and McManaman escape any punishment. Carver was fined £1,000 and warned as to his future conduct as a result.

Following Pardew's interest in the Crystal Palace job, Carver was put in temporary charge for Newcastle's next two matches against Burnley in the Premier League and Leicester City in the FA Cup. On 3 January 2015, and after Pardew's appointment at Crystal Palace was confirmed and soon after Newcastle's FA Cup exit, Carver put himself forward for the job, but urged the board to find a replacement after a 2–1 loss to Southampton on 17 January.

On 26 January, it was confirmed that Carver had been appointed temporary head coach until the end of the 2014–15 season. During his spell as caretaker manager, he had accrued three losses and a draw in all competitions. Five days after Carver was named the temporary head coach until the end of the season, he won his first match on 31 January, against Hull City. From 4 March to 2 May, he oversaw a run of eight successive league defeats, a club record for Newcastle in the Premier League. Despite such heavy losses, Carver still believed that he was "the best coach in the Premier League", though he later claimed that his words were taken out of context by the media after receiving widespread hilarity for his statement.

On the final day of the season, Newcastle beat West Ham United 2–0 to confirm their safety in the Premier League for the 2014–15 season. On 9 June, both Carver and coach Steve Stone had their contracts terminated by Newcastle ahead of the announcement of Steve McClaren as new head coach.

Omonia
On 4 June 2016, Carver was announced as the new manager of Cypriot club Omonia. On 23 February 2017, Carver was sacked by the club.

Scotland

On 31st August 2020 it was announced that John had joined Steve Clarke's coaching team with Scotland. He replaced Alex Dyer, who had become permanent manager at Kilmarnock F.C.

Managerial statistics

References

External links

1965 births
Living people
Footballers from Newcastle upon Tyne
English footballers
Association football defenders
Newcastle United F.C. players
Cardiff City F.C. players
Gateshead F.C. players
English Football League players
English football managers
Newcastle United F.C. managers
Leeds United F.C. managers
Toronto FC coaches
Sheffield United F.C. managers
AC Omonia managers
Premier League managers
English Football League managers
Newcastle United F.C. non-playing staff
Leeds United F.C. non-playing staff
Luton Town F.C. non-playing staff
Plymouth Argyle F.C. non-playing staff
Sheffield United F.C. non-playing staff
West Bromwich Albion F.C. non-playing staff
English expatriate sportspeople in Cyprus
English expatriate sportspeople in Canada
English expatriate football managers
Expatriate football managers in Cyprus
Expatriate soccer managers in Canada